The 2018 season was Lancashire Thunder's third season, in which they competed in the Women's Cricket Super League, a Twenty20 competition. The side finished fourth in the group stage, their best ever finish, winning five of their ten matches.

The side was captained by Danielle Hazell and coached by Alex Blackwell. They played two home matches at Old Trafford, and one apiece at Stanley Park, Aigburth Cricket Ground and the Trafalgar Road Ground.

Squad
Lancashire Thunder's 15-player squad is listed below. Age given is at the start of Lancashire Thunder's first match of the season (22 July 2018).

Women's Cricket Super League

Season standings

 Advanced to the Final.
 Advanced to the Semi-final.

League stage

Statistics

Batting

Bowling

Fielding

Wicket-keeping

References

Lancashire Thunder seasons
2018 in English women's cricket